Pedro Serrano is a New York Police Department officer who testified against the department in Floyd v. City of New York, a lawsuit brought by the Center for Constitutional Rights over the department's stop-and-frisk policies. He also made recordings of his superiors which suggested that the NYPD required arrest quotas from patrolmen which were used as evidence in the trial.

References

New York City Police Department officers
Puerto Rican law enforcement personnel